The Tempe Open is a defunct tennis tournament that was played on the Grand Prix tennis circuit in 1974. The event was held in Tempe, Arizona and was played on outdoor hard courts.  Jimmy Connors won the singles title while Jürgen Fassbender and Karl Meiler partnered to win the doubles title.

Singles

Doubles

References
 Singles Draw
 Doubles Draw

Grand Prix tennis circuit
Hard court tennis tournaments
Defunct tennis tournaments in the United States